was a Japanese manga artist.

Early life
On 29 January 1943, Chiba was born in Shenyang, Manchukuo (now part Liaoning, China).
His father worked in a paper factory in China. Chiba had two brothers, Tetsuya Chiba and Shigeyuki Chiba.

At the end of the Sino-Japanese War, Chiba's family lived in the attic of a work-acquaintance of his father until they could find a way to get back to Japan.

Career
Chiba was known for publishing his works in both shōnen and shōjo magazines. Chiba made his professional debut in 1967 with his manga Sabu to Chibi while working as an assistant to his older brother, Tetsuya. In 1977, he won the 22nd Shogakukan Manga Award for shōnen for his work on Captain and Play Ball.

Personal 
On 13 September 1984, Chiba committed suicide due to issues related to bipolar disorder. He was 41 years old.

Works
Listed chronologically.
 Kōsha Ura no Eleven (February 1971, Bessatsu Shōnen Jump, Shueisha)
 Han-chan (September 1971, Bessatsu Shōnen Jump)
 Michikusa (January 1972, Bessatsu Shōnen Sunday)
 Captain (26 volumes, 1972–1979, Bessatsu Shōnen Jump, made into an anime series in 1980)
 Play Ball (22 volumes, 1973–1978, Weekly Shōnen Jump)
 Fushigi Tōbo-kun (1982–1983, Weekly Shōnen Jump, written by Tarō Nami)
 Champ (April–November 1984, Weekly Shōnen Jump, written by Tarō Nami)
 This was his last work.

Sources:

See also
List of manga artists
Tetsuya Chiba

References

External links
 

1943 births
1984 suicides
Artists who committed suicide
Manga artists
Japanese people from Manchukuo
People with bipolar disorder
Suicides by hanging in Japan
1984 deaths